Mandy Nicole Maywood, OAM (born 1974) is an Australian visually impaired Paralympic swimmer.  At the 1988 Seoul Games, she won a silver medal in the Women's 50 m Breaststroke B3 event, and two bronze medals in the Women's 100 m Breaststroke B3 and Women's 200 m Breaststroke B3 events. At the 1992 Barcelona Games, she won a gold medal in the Women's 100 m Breaststroke B3 event, for which she received a Medal of the Order of Australia, and a bronze medal in the Women's 200 m Breaststroke B1–3 event. In 2000, she received an Australian Sports Medal.

References

Female Paralympic swimmers of Australia
Swimmers at the 1988 Summer Paralympics
Swimmers at the 1992 Summer Paralympics
Medalists at the 1988 Summer Paralympics
Medalists at the 1992 Summer Paralympics
Paralympic gold medalists for Australia
Paralympic silver medalists for Australia
Paralympic bronze medalists for Australia
Australian blind people
Paralympic swimmers with a vision impairment
Recipients of the Medal of the Order of Australia
Recipients of the Australian Sports Medal
1974 births
Living people
Paralympic medalists in swimming
Australian female breaststroke swimmers
Medalists at the World Para Swimming Championships
20th-century Australian women
21st-century Australian women